Manuel Balcells i Díaz (born January 9, 1958 in Ripoll)  is a Spanish politician from Catalonia.

References

1958 births
Living people
People from Ripollès
Republican Left of Catalonia politicians